James Hoey (5 May 1901 – 3 May 1988) was an English professional rugby league footballer who played in the 1920s and 1930s.

Playing career

International honours
Jimmy Hoey won a cap for England while at Widnes in 1930 against Other Nationalities.

County honours
Jimmy Hoey won cap(s) for Lancashire while at Widnes during the 1930–31 season.

Challenge Cup Final appearances
Jimmy Hoey played in Widnes' 10-3 victory over St. Helens in the 1929–30 Challenge Cup Final during the 1929–30 season at Wembley Stadium, London on Saturday 3 May 1930 in front of a crowd of 36,544.

County Cup Final appearances
Jimmy Hoey played , and scored a goal in Widnes' 4-5 defeat by Wigan in the 1928–29 Lancashire County Cup Final during the 1928–29 season at Wilderspool Stadium, Warrington on Saturday 24 November 1928.

Club career
In the 1932–33 season, Jimmy Hoey became the first player from any club to play and score in every game during a season, this record was equalled by William "Billy" Langton of Hunslet in the 1958–59 season.

Honoured at Widnes
Jimmy Hoey is a Widnes Hall Of Fame Inductee.

Genealogical information
Jimmy Hoey is the brother of the rugby league footballer who played in the 1930s and 1940s for Widnes; William Hoey.

References

External links
Statistics at rugby.widnes.tv
Hall Of Fame at rugby.widnes.tv

1901 births
1988 deaths
England national rugby league team players
English rugby league players
Lancashire rugby league team players
Place of birth missing
Place of death missing
Rugby league centres
Rugby league players from Widnes
Rugby league second-rows
Widnes Vikings players